"New Spanish Two Step" is a Western swing standard based on a traditional fiddle tune, "Spanish Two Step". Bob Wills and His Texas Playboys recorded the latter on September 23, 1935, and released it on Vocalion 03230 in 1936. Ten years later, Wills and Tommy Duncan added lyrics and recorded it again on April 25, 1945, releasing it on Columbia 36966 in April 1946 as "New Spanish Two Step". It stayed on the charts for 23 weeks, reaching number one on the Folk-Jukebox chart for 16 weeks. Both versions were one of the band's signature songs.

Wills and his vocalist, Tommy Duncan, added lyrics to reflect the title:

  
The "b" side, "Roly Poly", was also a big hit, reaching number three.

See also
 Billboard Most-Played Folk Records of 1946

References

Bibliography
McWhorter, Frankie. Cowboy Fiddler in Bob Wills' Band. University of North Texas Press, 1997. 

Western swing songs
1946 songs
Billboard Hot Country Songs number-one singles of the year
Songs written by Bob Wills
Songs written by Tommy Duncan